Mark Allan Noll (born 1946) is an American historian specializing in the history of Christianity in the United States. He holds the position of Research Professor of History at Regent College, having previously been Francis A. McAnaney Professor of History at the University of Notre Dame. Noll is a Reformed evangelical Christian and in 2005 was named by Time magazine as one of the twenty-five most influential evangelicals in America.

Biography
Born on July 18, 1946, Noll is a graduate of Wheaton College, Illinois (B.A, English), the University of Iowa (M.A., English), Trinity Evangelical Divinity School (M.A., Church History and Theology), and Vanderbilt University (Ph.D, History of Christianity). Before coming to Notre Dame, he was on the faculty at Wheaton College, Illinois for twenty-seven years, where he taught in the departments of history and theology as McManis Professor of Christian Thought. While at Wheaton, Noll also co-founded (with Nathan Hatch) and directed the Institute for the Study of American Evangelicals (ISAE), which ran from 1982 until 2014.

Noll is a prolific author and many of his books have earned considerable acclaim within the academic community. In particular, The Scandal of the Evangelical Mind, a book about anti-intellectual tendencies within the American evangelical movement, was widely covered in both religious and secular publications. He was awarded a National Humanities Medal in the Oval Office by President George W. Bush in 2006.

Noll, along with other historians such as George Marsden, Nathan O. Hatch, and David Bebbington, has greatly contributed to the world's understanding of evangelical convictions and attitudes, past and present. He has caused many scholars and lay people to realize more deeply the complications inherent in the question, "Is America a Christian nation?"

In 1994, he co-signed Evangelicals and Catholics Together, an ecumenical document that expressed the need for greater cooperation between evangelical and Catholic leaders in the United States.

From 2006 to 2016, Noll was a faculty member in Department of History at Notre Dame. He replaced the retiring George Marsden as Notre Dame's Francis A. McAnaney Professor of History. Noll stated that the move to Notre Dame allowed him to concentrate on fewer subjects than his duties at Wheaton had allowed.

Works

Books

——— , Hatch, Nathan O, Marsden, George M., (1989). The Search for Christian America. Helmers & Howard.

Articles

References

External links
 Mark Noll Notre Dame home page

1946 births
Living people
American evangelicals
American historians of religion
National Humanities Medal recipients
Presidents of the American Society of Church History
Trinity Evangelical Divinity School alumni
University of Notre Dame faculty
Vanderbilt University alumni
Wheaton College (Illinois) alumni
Wheaton College (Illinois) faculty
World Christianity scholars